Michael Kerr (April 1934 – 30 January 2021) was an Irish Gaelic football player, manager and administrator.

Career
Kerr began his club career at underage level with Beragh Red Knights. After lining out in two minor finals he began a 17-year senior career in 1952, winning a St Enda's Cup title in 1958. Kerr made his breakthrough with the Tyrone senior football team as a 19-year-old. He played at right corner-forward when Tyrone won their maiden Ulster Championship title in 1956. Following his playing career, Kerr continued his involvement in Gaelic football as manager of the Beragh Red Knights senior team on a number of occasions, however, it was at juvenile level that he enjoyed coaching success.

Honours
Beragh Red Knights
St Enda's Cup: 1958

Tyrone
Ulster Senior Football Championship: 1956

References

1934 births
2021 deaths
Beragh Red Knights Gaelic footballers
Gaelic games administrators
Tyrone inter-county Gaelic footballers